The Archambault A35R and Archambault A35RC are a series of French sailboats that were designed by Joubert Nivelt Design as racer-cruisers and first built in 2014.

The Archambault A35R is often confused with the 2006 Archambault A35, which it succeeded in production.

Production
The design was built by Archambault Boats of Dangé-Saint-Romain and also by the BG Race shipyard in Saint-Malo in France between 2014 and 2017, but it is now out of production. Archambault, which had been founded in 1967, went out of business in 2015. The BG Race shipyard, founded in 2013, built many designs for Archambault and went out of business in 2017.

Design
The Archambault A35R is a racing keelboat, built predominantly of polyester sandwich construction fibreglass, with the deck from a PVC vinylester fibreglass sandwich. It has a 9/10 fractional sloop rig with a masthead spinnaker. It has carbon fibre spars, including a fixed bowsprit. The mast is keel-stepped and has two sets of swept spreaders. The hull has a plumb stem, an open reverse transom, an internally mounted spade-type rudder controlled by a tiller and a fixed fin keel. Dual rudders and wheel steering were factory options. It displaces  and carries  of lead ballast.

The mainsheet traveller is located on the deck, just aft of the rudder post.

The boat is fitted with an inboard  diesel engine for docking and manoeuvring.

The design has sleeping accommodation for six people, with a double "V"-berth in the bow cabin, two straight settees in the main cabin around a drop leaf table and an aft cabin with a double berth on the port side. The galley is located on the port side just forward of the companionway ladder. The galley is "L"-shaped and is equipped with a two-burner stove and a sink. A navigation station is opposite the galley, on the starboard side. The head is located just aft of the navigation station on the starboard side.

When equipped with twin wheels and a redesigned interior, the boat is known as the Archambault A35RC.

See also
List of sailing boat types

References

External links
A35R cabin tour in Italian

Keelboats
2010s sailboat type designs
Sailing yachts
Sailboat type designs by Joubert-Nivelt
Sailboat types built by Archambault Boats
Sailboat types built by BG Race